The Venetian patriciate was one of the three social bodies into which the society of the Republic of Venice was divided, together with citizens and foreigners.  was the noble title of the members of the aristocracy ruling the city of Venice and the Republic. The title was abbreviated, in front of the name, by the initials N.H. ( or ), together with the feminine variant N.D.. Holding the title of a Venetian patrician was a great honour and many European kings and princes, as well as foreign noble families, are known to have asked for and obtained the prestigious title.

The patrician houses, formally recorded in the Golden Book, were primarily divided into Old Houses and New Houses, with the former being noted for traditionally electing the first Doge in 697 AD. The New Houses were no less significant, as many became very prominent and important in the history of the Republic of Venice. The families were furthermore divided into several other "categories", including Ducal Houses (whose members had become Doges), Newest Houses raised to the patriciate in 1381, non-Venetian patrician families, and "Houses made for money" (usually wealthy landowning or bourgeoisie families who contributed to the state during the War of Candia and the Morean War).

Although there were numerous noble houses across Venice's Mainland Dominions and the State of the Sea, the Republic was in fact ruled as an aristocratic oligarchy by about 20 to 30 families of Venice's urban nobility, who elected the Doge of Venice, held political and military offices, and directly participated in the daily governing of the state. They were predominantly merchants, with their main source of income being trade with the East and other entrepreneurial activities, on which they became incredibly wealthy. Some of the most important families, who dominated the politics and the history of the state, include those such as the Contarini, Cornaro, Dandolo, Giustinian, Loredan, Mocenigo, Morosini and the Venier families. Nobles were forbidden by law to marry outside of the nobility, so the families intermarried within themselves, and from a young age followed the cursus honorum of Venetian noblemen, training in the army, the naval fleet, the law, and the affairs of state.

Characteristics 

The basic foundation of belonging to the patriciate was the exclusive possession of political power. Starting from the Great Council Lockout of 1297 and the law of 1320 which precluded the inclusion of new families, this social body became the only one to have the privilege of sitting in the Great Council, the highest governing body of the city and the state. Privilege concretised with the right for each male member of noble families, starting from the age of majority, to participate in the sessions.

Within the patriciate, all members enjoyed absolute political equality. Each vote, including that of the Doge, had the same value during the voting of the councils. Reflection of this principle was the equal title of "Nobleman" recognized to the patricians, without any distinction, throughout the Republic. Whoever wore it carried within himself a portion of that sovereignty in which every patrician was a participant, together with the other members of his class. This made the Venetian patricians, in the noble hierarchy, of a rank equal to that of the Princes of the Blood (also given the equal possibility of rising to the royal rank of Doge).

The importance of this social body was such that every aspect of the Venetian noble's life was carefully monitored and regulated by the State, which took care to carefully verify all family ties and deeds necessary to prove the registration of the nobles into the Golden Book (Libro d'Oro), the register of nobles strictly guarded in the Doge's Palace. There was also a Silver Book, which registered all those families that not only had the requisites of "civilization" and "honour", but could also show that they were of ancient Venetian origin; such families furnished the manpower for the State bureaucracy – and particularly, the chancellery within the Doge's Palace itself. Both books were kept in a chest in the Scrigno room of the Doge's Palace, inside a cupboard that also contained all the documents proving the legitimacy of claims to be inscribed therein.

The robe of the nobles was the toga of black cloth with wide sleeves, lined in red for the Savi, the Avogadori and the leaders of the Quarantia. The toga became completely red for the senators and the ducal councilors. The whole was completed by the squat beret (a low cylindrical hat of black cloth) and the fur indicating the rank within the magistracy. It was an absolute obligation to wear the regalia during the exercise of one's office, in the councils and in the entire area of Saint Mark's Square.

Alongside this political aspect, however, the Venetian nobility had another peculiar character in their mercantile vocation. Contrary to the feudal nobility, in fact, the patriciate in Venice based its power not on the possession of land, but on the wealth of trade with the East as the basis of the entire economy. This stimulated this social class to a remarkable dynamism and resulted in incredible wealth.

The patricians thus served themselves and the state as captains of galleys, merchants, ambassadors, governors, public officials, and in every other form of civil and military organisation of the Republic.

Being Venetian patricians was an honour for all of European nobility and it was common with princes and kings of other states to ask for and obtain the title of N.H., including, among others, the kings of France, the Savoy, the Mancinis, the Rospigliosi, and the papal families of the Orsini and the Colonna.

Noble houses 
Firstly, these very ancient families that died out before the Great Council Lockout of 1297, but which nevertheless played a leading role in the politics of the Republic, should be mentioned. Given their historical distance, the information and knowledge about these families is very scarce and steeped in legend.

Old houses 
The group of Old houses, whose members were called "longhi", has been well defined since the 1350s. In the so-called "pseudo-Giustinian" Chronicle, drawn up at that time, the group is distinguished from the already substantial corpus of patricians of twenty-four (or, better, twenty-five) families more powerful and constantly engaged in Venetian political life. In the Chronicle these patrician houses are divided into two further groups: the first includes the families Badoer, Baseggio, Contarini, Corner, Dandolo, Falier, Giustinian, Gradenigo-Dolfin, Morosini, Michiel, Polani and Sanudo; the second includes the families Barozzi, Belegno (later Bragadin), Bembo, Gauli, Memmo, Querini, Soranzo, Tiepolo, Zane, Zeno, Ziani (later Salamon) and Zorzi. 

The author of the paper justifies this situation by listing in detail the deeds performed by their ancestors in the foundation of Venice. Although imaginative, the information contained in the Chronicle served to distinguish an elitist nucleus from the large mass of families included after the Serrata, above all those New houses that during the fifteenth century would contend with the "longhi" for the ducal throne.

It should also be noted that tradition defined twelve "apostolic" families (Contarini, Tiepolo, Morosini, Michiel, Badoer, Sanudo, Gradenigo-Dolfin, Memmo, Falier, Dandolo, Polani and Barozzi) and four other "evangelical" ones (Giustinian, Corner, Bragadin and Bembo); the history of Venice evidently wanted to be compared to that of the Church, founded on the Twelve Apostles and advocated by the Four Evangelists.

Later, the Bragadin replaced the Belegno and the Salamon replaced the Ziani, following the two families' extinctions.

New houses 
This group includes numerous patrician families who were not part of the Old houses, but were nevertheless very significant, as some became very prominent and important in the politics of the Republic.

Ducal houses 
These are fifteen families of more recent nobility than the "longhi" (their members were called, not surprisingly, "curti"), as underlined by the same "pseudo-Giustinian" Chronicle. From it we learn that only the Barbarigo, the Marcello and the Moro had contributed to the foundation of Rialto by giving tribunes; Foscari, Gritti, Malipiero, Priuli, Trevisan, Tron and Venier are recognized as of non-Venetian origin; of the Donà, of the Grimani and of the Lando there is no information because they are only mentioned, while the Loredan are said to have originated from ancient Rome and were admitted to the Great Council under Doge Reniero Zeno (r. 1253–1268) or two centuries earlier, according to Jacopo Zabarella; finally, the Mocenigo do not even appear.

The Vendramin family can also be counted among the ducal families who, despite having been aggregated only in 1381 after the War of Chioggia, managed to elect the doge Andrea Vendramin not even a century later.

Others 
Some other families considered part of the Case nuove include:

Families which can be added to these include the Albizzo, Basadonna, Coppo, dalle Boccole, da Lezze, d'Arduin, Fabriciacio, Galanti, Gambarin, Lanzuoli, Lombardo, Mazaman, Miegano, Mussolino, Navigroso, Sesendillo, Signolo, Viaro, Vielmo, Volpe, Zaguri, and the Zancani. 

To these were added in 1298 some Venetian families which, at the time of the Serrata, were in the East, notably in Constantinople:

Other families added in 1298 include the Costantino, Donadi, Marcipian, Massoli, Ruzier, Stanieri, Tolonigo, and the Tonisto.

The remainder came from Acre and were added in 1303. These include the Barison, Benedetti (another branch), Bondulmier (another branch), Lion, Marmora, Molin (the Molin d'Oro branch) and the Surian (another branch). All but the Lion and the Surian appear to have attended the Council sometime before the Serrata.

Then there were fifteen families descended from citizens who had distinguished themselves in the repression of the Tiepolo conspiracy in 1310, some of which include:

Other families added in 1310 include the Addoldo, Agrinal, Buoninsegna, Caroso, Diente, Diesello, Ferro, Grisoni, Mengolo (another branch), Papaciza, Sesendillo (another branch), and the Vidor.

Newest houses 

At the turn of the fourteenth century, the War of Chioggia brought the Venetian economy to its knees. The Genoese fleet, deployed at the entrance to the Lagoon, had blocked all forms of commercial exchange and thus the revenue in terms of import duties.

In 1379 the Venetian government decreed the granting of entry into the Patriciate to the thirty commoners who had contributed most in any way to the war effort. Many flocked to it, some making their servants, their children or themselves available, some keeping a group of soldiers, some arming galleys, some simply giving money. After the conflict, on 4 September 1381 the Senate elected the winners from a shortlist of sixty-two candidates (for a total of fifty-eight families). It is difficult to establish on the basis of which criterion this choice was made: many of the rejected had participated in the war effort with conspicuous offers, conversely there were those who were admitted with a very modest contribution. Evidently other factors weighed on them, including the marriage strategies that had allowed many non-nobles to create solid ties with the "old houses" of the aristocracy.

In the list there are eleven candidates with the same surname to that of families already present in the Patriciate, and they can be presumed to belong to undocumented or illegitimate branches of those families.

Non-Venetian patricians 

Some time after the Serrata, the Patriciate was also conferred on those families of the mainland who had given military support to the Republic on various occasions. There are thirty-one families in all, but many never participated in Venetian politics, maintaining a merely honorific title.

Houses made for money 

Having become almost inaccessible for centuries, the noble body resumed opening up to new families when, with the decline of Venetian power, the State began to "sell" the title (for 100,000 ducats) to fill the public coffers, no longer supported by profitable trade with the East. Between the seventeenth and eighteenth centuries there were three openings to the aristocracy, with the aggregation of one hundred and thirty-four families such as the Medicis and the Gherardinis, (a not inconsiderable contribution, given that the nobility had been suffering from a serious demographic crisis for some time). Some of these families had already been making history in the Venetian hinterland for centuries, and their titles sometimes dated back to the Holy Roman Empire (such as the Brandolini, the Martinengo, the Piovene, the Spineda, the Valmarana). Others were bourgeoisie families enriched through trade (Benzon di San Vidal, Lin, Zanardi).

Barnabotti 
A particular category of patricians was constituted by the fallen nobles, called Barnabotti, who, having dissipated the family wealth, still maintained their right to vote in the Great Council. They were a class of impoverished nobility whose name is derived from the fact that the group met and lived in the zone of the Campo San Barnaba (the area, being distant from the city centre, attracted lower rents). Towards the end of the Republic they often represented the tip of the balance between the political factions of the council, influencing it through the trading of their votes to which they were often dedicated, usually selling them in the Orchard of Saint Mark.

During the eighteenth century the Venetian political system underwent a sclerosis. The aristocracy in the fifteenth and sixteenth centuries was very numerous; a high birth rate among the nobility, combined with the mercantile (and merchant-entrepreneur) profession undertaken by a large part of this class, involved a broad aristocratic government with varied interests, in which the poor nobles were a minority. There were, however, numerous events of social mobility within the class, brought about by the rapid enrichments in trade with the East and by the new factories set up in the Lagoon. During the seventeenth and eighteenth centuries the economic situation worsened, more and more after 1618, and the Venetian aristocracy was increasingly dependent on their properties in the mainland and in the colonies, as well as on public sinecures. In Europe the idea spread that trade and industry were unworthy of the aristocracy, an idea rejected by the Venetian aristocracy, but which nevertheless changed the mentality of the nobility. The wars against the Ottomans of the mid- and late-1600s decreased trade with the East for many years, as well as in the early 1700s, ruining other merchant families or those who had not been able to diversify their investments in land and real estate. Few families changed their economic status considerably and rapidly upward, allowing an increasingly small group of families to maintain a relatively large wealth, while many others were constantly losing their position, often without even the money to decently live on.This made the Barnabotti an evident phenomenon of Venetian society, while a reflection began on how to change forms of government. In fact, a group, the oligarchs, consisting of the richest families, managed, even by corrupting the poorest nobles, to exclude the middle and poor who were not at their service. The Venetian government, through the Council of Ten and the state inquisitors, however, prevented reforms of any kind (also because these bodies were in the hands of the oligarchy that was taking over the state, to its exclusive advantage). Attempts at reform were tried, but never implemented, in particular during the reign of Francesco Loredan, when Angelo Querini in 1761 tried to restore power to the more collegial organs of the Venetian aristocracy, while in the late 1770s Giorgio Pisani and Carlo Contarini, through the formation of a sort of "noble party", attempted an overall reform. At the center of their proposals there was precisely the social and political recovery of the poorest parts of the Venetian nobility, done through the assignment of dowries to the young patricians, especially the poor ones, increase in the salaries of the Forty and other Colleges, granting of donations for some prestigious political positions (previously free and then monopolised by rich nobles), setting a uniform for the nobles in order to distinguish them from the commoners, etc. In practice, they advocated for the creation of a "political" aristocracy and service, collectively capable of governing the city and the empire. Then there were some issues arising with the new Enlightenment ideas, such as opposition to internal espionage (which was very common in Venice), freedom of speech, defence and resumption of trade, etc. Precisely this attempt at a "noble reaction", not without populist maneuvers in favour of the Barnabotti, was crushed by the spies of the inquisitors, who, well informed, accused the two of having bought electoral votes from some Barnabottis, and also accused them of conspiring. They imprisoned Contarini in Cattaro (where he died, perhaps poisoned) and Pisani in Vicenza. When the French and the Jacobins arrived, Pisani tried to legitimise himself as an opponent of the despotism of the state inquisitors, of which he had been a victim, but, recognized for what he was, namely an aristocrat who had tried to modernise the structures of the Republic of Venice, however still remaining within the nobility, and indeed strengthening its aristocratic character, the new rulers marginalised it.

Residences

Palaces

Villas

Bibliography 

 Dorit Raines, "Cooptazione, aggregazione e presenza al Maggior Consiglio: le casate del patriziato veneziano, 1297-1797" (PDF), in Storia di Venezia - Rivista, I, 2003, pp. 2–64,  (WC · ACNP).
 Todesco Maria-Teresa, "Andamento demografico della nobiltà veneziana allo specchio delle votazioni nel Maggior Consiglio (1297-1797)" (PDF), in Ateneo Veneto, CLXXVI, 1989.
 Francesco Schröeder, Repertorio genealogico delle famiglie confermate nobili e dei titolati nobili esistenti nelle Provincie Venete, Venezia, Tipografia di Alvisopoli, 1830, p. 246.
 Renzo Derosas, Dal patriziato alla nobiltà. Aspetti della crisi dell'aristocrazia veneziana nella prima metà dell'Ottocento. Publications de l'École française de Rome 107.1 (1988): 333–363.

References 

Republic of Venice
Nobility of Italian states